Sayyed Ja'far Pishevari (26     ( Azerbaijani: سید جعفر پیشهوری ) August, 1892 – 11 June, 1947) was an Iranian Azerbaijani communist politician who most-notably founded and led the Azerbaijani Democratic Party, the founding and ruling party of the Azerbaijan People's Government.

Life
He was born in Khalkhal in Ardabil province, Iran. He had lived in the Caucasus in the early 20th century and was introduced to Marxism during this period. He was a member of the Russian Social Democratic Labour Party.

He was a founding member of the Communist Party of Iran (not to be confused with the Tudeh Party), established in 1920, in Rasht. He became a journalist and communist activist in the 1920s.

In 1921, Pishevari served the Soviets as minister of the interior in the Persian Socialist Soviet Republic.

He was arrested and imprisoned during nine years in the late 1930s and early 1940s by the government of Reza Shah Pahlavi for his communist ideas and activities. He was released from prison after Reza Shah was deposed by the Allies in 1941. Pishevari was the Tudeh Party of Iran candidate for the Majlis and was elected, but was denied entry by the rest of deputies. Of the 100 votes cast, his credentials were rejected 47–50.

He then established the Azerbaijani Democratic Party with manifest material and organizational support from the USSR.

Political career

The Soviet Union founded the communist Azerbaijan People's Government in November 1945 during their occupation of Northern Iran, making Pishevari its leader. It seems however that the strong man of this government was Mohammed Biriya, Minister of Propaganda and head of secret police trained by the NKVD. His government's actions, including organizing and arming local militias, disarming of regular Iranian military and police forces, setting up an independent judiciary based on the Soviet legal system, nationalising banks, levying taxes, land reform without ratification of the Majlis, using Azerbaijani as the official language and banning the usage of Persian, and setting up an alternative curriculum and educational system, were viewed with deep suspicion by the central government and other Iranians.

Following an agreement reached between the governments of Iran and the USSR under intense American pressure, who viewed Pishevari's government as a not-too-subtle scheme by the USSR to partition Iran, the Soviets removed their protection. Iranian armed forces, kept away from the provinces of Azerbaijan and Kurdistan by the Red Army presence since 1942, entered these provinces in November 1946. Pishevari's self-proclaimed government collapsed quickly, as many of the people welcomed the central government's troops. By December 1946, both Azerbaijan and Kurdistan were evacuated by the Soviet forces and the Iranian government re-established control over the USSR-occupied territories. It appeared as if Pishevari's government was becoming very unpopular, especially in larger cities where the merchants feared communism.

After the collapse of this short-lived republic, he fled to Azerbaijan SSR and died in a car crash in Baku in 1947. Some historians speculate that he was killed by the KGB. To date, their claim has not been verified.

His legacy is a matter of heated debate today. While many Iranians consider him as either a Soviet stooge or a traitor, he is considered a national hero for Azeri nationalists or a socialist revolutionary by the Iranian Left. It is now beyond doubt that he had the support of Joseph Stalin and the USSR in setting up his government. There is also no doubt that USSR indeed wanted to annex several provinces in northern Iran.

Available sources show that Soviet territorial aspirations included provinces of Azerbaijan, Kurdistan, Gilan, Mazandaran, and Khorasan. What Pishevari intended to achieve and his role in the Soviet plans is a matter of debate though. Some scholars on the Left argue that he never intended to partition Iran and what he wanted was a gradual transformation of the whole country to a communist state. Those on the Right argue that the proclamations and directives issued by his person and his government leave no doubt that he intended to join his republic to the Azerbaijan SSR, and thus the Soviet Union.

References

External links
1945-46 Iranian Crisis Cold War International History Project, Retrieved 2008-05-22
photograph, Retrieved 2008-05-22

People from Khalkhal, Iran
1890s births
1947 deaths
Road incident deaths in Azerbaijan
Road incident deaths in the Soviet Union
Azerbaijani Democratic Party politicians
Azerbaijani communists
Soviet Azerbaijani people
Iranian emigrants to the Soviet Union
Azerbaijani people of Iranian descent
Iranian revolutionaries
Iranian communists
Burials at Alley of Honor
People granted political asylum in the Soviet Union
Iranian elected officials who did not take office
Tudeh Party of Iran politicians
Azerbaijani independence activists
Foreign Communist Party of the Soviet Union members
Communist Party of Persia politicians
Separatists